Kundaveli (East) is a village in the Udayarpalayam taluk of Ariyalur district, Tamil Nadu, India.

Demographics 

As per the 2001 census, Kundaveli (East) had a total population of 5229 with 2625 males and 2604 females.

References 

Villages in Ariyalur district